This is an episode list for the 1980s anthology series Tales from the Darkside.

Series overview

Episodes

Pilot (1983)

Season 1 (1984–85)

Season 2 (1985–86)

Season 3 (1986–87)

Season 4 (1987–88)

See also
Tales from the Darkside: The Movie

External links
 IMDb Tales from the Darkside Episode List

Tales from the Darkside